The Preble Box Toe Company explosion occurred on November 8, 1928, at the company's factory in Lynn, Massachusetts. Eleven people died in the blast and resulting fires and another nine later died from their injuries, making it the deadliest explosion to occur in Greater Boston.

Factory
As a result, it was surrounded by a thickly-settled residential neighborhood. It was built from concrete and reinforced steel with a cement floor and was thought to be fire proof.

Explosion
Around 7:40 am a series of explosions occurred at the factory. The first explosion saw flames shoot out of the roof and from all four sides of the buildings. The cement bricks that made up the building were sent over Groveland Street and five houses behind the factory caught fire and were badly damaged. Two workmen were blasted through a one-foot thick cement wall and another was blown through a door and landed in the street twenty feet away. A total of 11 people died in the blast and nine more died from injuries they suffered in the blast. Fifty people who lived near the factory or were passing through the area were injured by broken glass.

The first fire alarm was sounded by a twelve-year-old boy who had to be boosted up by a friend to reach the fire alarm box. Apparatuses from Swampscott, Marblehead and Saugus assisted the Lynn Fire Department at the scene while crews from Peabody and Revere filled the empty Lynn stations. John Kelley, owner of a laundry across the street from the factory, allowed his store to be used as a Red Cross station.

Blaney family
The home closest to the factory (44 Groveland Street) belonged to the Blaney family. It caught fire soon after the explosion. Lillian Blaney and four of her children died as the walls of their home collapsed. The Blaneys' eldest daughter, Vivan, died in the hospital later that day. Two of the Blaney children escaped from the house but were badly burned and two others were not home when the disaster occurred. Lillian Blaney and her five children were buried in Pine Grove Cemetery on November 11, 1928. Over 500 people showed up to the funeral services. President Calvin Coolidge sent a letter of condolence to the family's eldest surviving son, Harry Blaney Jr. Family patriarch Harry Blaney died from his injuries on November 21. Lynn Mayor Ralph S. Bauer started a fund to aid the surviving Blaney children.

Cause of the explosion
In the aftermath of the disaster, the state fire marshal reported that the blast had been caused by vapors rising from liquids used in the factory that caught fire and then exploded. Lynn fire chief Edward E. Chase found an ashtray containing cigarette butts and ash in the ruins of the factory, even though smoking was prohibited on the premises. State chemist Perley L. Charter reported that pyroxylin, acetic ether, guncotton, naphtha, and alcohol were found in the factory. Pyroxylin, a liquid solution made by treating dry guncotton with acetic ether, was used to make imitation leather for shoes. According to Charter, even the finished product in danger of exploding and a factory using such volatile chemicals should have not been permitted within 500 feet of a residence (the nearest residence to the Preble factory was 12 feet away). A grand jury investigation found that four to five tons of celluloid and inflammable liquid were kept on the property.

An inquest was held before Judge Ralph W. Reeve. Reeve's report concluded that The Preble Box Toe Company did not realize the dangerous conditions in their factory and that "the unlawful acts and negligence of the [company]...contributed to the deaths of all these deceased persons". The report also criticized Chief Chase, who, according to Reeve "did not have the proper conception of his duties in reference to fire prevention and, consequently, did not perform those duties properly", but that his neglect was so indirect he could not be blamed for the deaths. Chase disputed Reeve's findings, stating that he had done nothing improper and was being made a scapegoat. A grand jury indicted the Preble Box Toe Company for using a lot of land without a license and for storing inflammable fluid without a license. The jury also recommended that changes be made to the Lynn Fire Department and criticized its captain in charge of fire inspection, John H. Day, who had been to the factory three times, but did not realize the dangers that the chemicals used there posed.

The Preble Box Toe Company's insurer, Travelers Insurance Company, refused to pay double indemnity to the dependents of those killed or injured in the explosion. On September 25, 1929, the Chairman of the State Industrial Accident Board denied the claims on the grounds that there was not enough evidence to prove that the Preble Box Toe Company "was guilty of serious and willful misconduct".

Notes

References

1928 disasters in the United States
1928 fires in the United States
1928 in Massachusetts
Explosions in 1928
Explosions in Massachusetts
Industrial fires and explosions in the United States
Urban fires in the United States
Lynn, Massachusetts
Factory fires